Niel Botha (born 14 September 1995) is a South African cricketer. He made his Twenty20 cricket debut for Boland on 12 September 2015 in the 2015 Africa T20 Cup. He made his first-class debut for Boland in the 2016–17 Sunfoil 3-Day Cup on 12 January 2017.

References

External links
 

1995 births
Living people
South African cricketers
Boland cricketers
Place of birth missing (living people)
Cambridge University cricketers